Bonrepòs i Mirambell is a municipality in the comarca of Horta Nord in the Valencian Community, Spain.

Famous persons
 Carlos Soler, football player

References

Municipalities in the Province of Valencia
Horta Nord